Six Points is an unincorporated community in Washington Township, Clay County, Indiana. It is part of the Terre Haute Metropolitan Statistical Area.

History
Six Points was named for a 6-way intersection.

Geography

References

Unincorporated communities in Clay County, Indiana
Unincorporated communities in Indiana
Terre Haute metropolitan area